The Autódromo Internacional José Tobar, formerly known as the Autodromo Internacional de Yahuarcocha, is a motorsport circuit located in Ibarra, Ecuador, around the lake Yawarkucha. It has hosted events in the Formula Renault series. During the 1960s the construction of the new and current layout was ordered and it came into shape and was finished by the start of the 1970s, with a new and smaller layout due to the old layout being ruled too dangerous given the danger of crashing in water. 
The circuit is currently used for local motor-sport events; national motor-sports championship or single events, which are composed my amateur and/or semi-professional teams. 
The most featured and important race is the "Larga Duracion", which consists of 6 hours of endurance racing and brings participants from neighboring countries to participate. The circuit's facilities are outdated, and have not been renewed since around mid 1990s, including paddock, grandstands and pit-lane. 

The course is the closest FIA-graded track to the Equator.

Autódromo Mayor
This version of the track is no longer active.

Autódromo Internacional José Tobar
It has a clock-wise layout, with high and medium speed corners with slight changes of elevation in the first and middle sectors, and by the final corner, a slightly steep hairpin to the right, after which comes the Home Straight.
Some current major events include:
 Larga Duracion (6h Endurance Race)
 Drag Racing on home straight
 National Championship Dates
 Semi-Truck Events

External links
Track information

Motorsport venues in Ecuador
Buildings and structures in Imbabura Province
1970 establishments in Ecuador
Sports venues completed in 1970